The Custer Slaughter House, located west of Shoshone in Lincoln County, Idaho, was built in the late 1890s.  It was built near railroad tracks and the Little Wood River.  It was listed on the National Register of Historic Places in 1983.

Description
The house is a lava rock structure.

It was deemed to be architecturally significant "as it is an early example of a commercial building built with lava rock."

Owned by Brandon & Jaelyn Lockwood

See also

 National Register of Historic Places listings in Lincoln County, Idaho

References

External links

Houses on the National Register of Historic Places in Idaho
Houses completed in 1890
Lincoln County, Idaho